The Ministry of Local Government, Rural and Urban Development is a government ministry, responsible for local government in Zimbabwe. The incumbent minister is July Moyo and the deputy minister is Sesel Zvidzai. It oversees:
 Municipalities of Zimbabwe
 Districts of Zimbabwe
 Provinces of Zimbabwe

References

Government of Zimbabwe
 
 
 
Local government ministries